KEMBA Live! (originally the  PromoWest Pavilion) is a multi-purpose concert venue located in the Arena District of Columbus, Ohio. Opening in 2001, the venues operates year-round with indoor and outdoor facilities: the Indoor Music Hall and Outdoor Amphitheater. The venue was modeled after the House of Blues and described as the "Newport Music Hall on steroids". It features state-of-the-art lighting, acoustical systems and a reversible stage. In 2001, the venue was nominated for a Pollstar Awards for "Best New Major Concert Venue".

A sister venue, Stage AE is located in Pittsburgh, Pennsylvania and opened in December 2010. In 2018, Promowest Productions and its venues were acquired by American entertainment presenter AEG. In August 2021, PromoWest Productions and AEG opened another sister venue, PromoWest Pavilion at OVATION, in Newport, Kentucky (near Cincinnati, Ohio).

Names
PromoWest Pavilion 
Lifestyle Communities Pavilion 
Express Live! 
KEMBA Live!

References

Economy of Columbus, Ohio
Music venues in Columbus, Ohio
Amphitheaters in Ohio
Arena District